LispWorks is computer software, a proprietary implementation and integrated development environment (IDE) for the programming language Common Lisp. LispWorks was developed by the UK software company Harlequin Ltd., and first published in 1989. Harlequin ultimately spun off its Lisp division as Xanalys Ltd., which took over management and rights to LispWorks. In January 2005, the Xanalys Lisp team formed LispWorks Ltd. to market, develop, and support the software.

LispWorks's features include:
 A native-code compiler and an interpreter for an extended ANSI Common Lisp
 An implementation of the Common Lisp Object System with support for the metaobject protocol
 Support for 32-bit and 64-bit versions
 Native threads and symmetric multiprocessing
 Unicode support: it can read and write files, and supports strings, so encoded
 Foreign language interface (FFI) to interface with routines written in C
 A Java interface
 The common application programming interface (CAPI) graphical user interface (GUI) toolkit, which provides native look-and-feel on Windows, Cocoa, GTK+, and Motif
 An Emacs-like editor; source code is included in the Professional edition
 A Lisp Listener, which provides a Common Lisp read–eval–print loop (REPL)
 A graphical debugger, inspector, stepper, profiler, class browser, etc.
 A facility to generate standalone executables and shared libraries; to reduce memory size, a tree shaker can be used to remove unused code and data
 On macOS, it provides a bridge to Objective-C for using Apple's Cocoa libraries
 Many of the libraries are written using the Common Lisp Object System (CLOS) and can be extended by the user, by writing subclasses and new methods

The Enterprise edition also includes KnowledgeWorks, which supports rule-based or logic programming (including support for Prolog); the CommonSQL database interface; and a Common Object Request Broker Architecture (CORBA) binding.

In September 2009, it was announced that LispWorks 6 would support concurrent threads and the CAPI graphics toolkit had been extended to support GTK+. LispWorks 6.1, released in January 2012, included many further enhancements to CAPI, such as support for anti-aliased drawing.

LispWorks ran on the spacecraft Deep Space 1. The application called RAX won the NASA Software of the Year award in 1999.

Releases

See also
Allegro Common Lisp

References

Common Lisp implementations
Common Lisp (programming language) software
Lisp (programming language)